Keratosis follicularis may refer to:
 Darier's disease
 Focal palmoplantar keratoderma with oral mucosal hyperkeratosis

See also:
 Isolated dyskeratosis follicularis
 Keratosis follicularis spinulosa decalvans

Genodermatoses
Palmoplantar keratodermas